Gianfranco Baruchello (29 August 1924 – 14 January 2023) was an Italian painter, poet, and filmmaker.

A partner of Marcel Duchamp, he was also very close with Gilles Deleuze and Jean-François Lyotard. His artistic style was avant-garde and post-modern.

Baruchello died in Rome on 14 January 2023, at the age of 98.

Filmography
La Verifica incerta (1965)
Costretto a scomparire (1968)
Perforce (1968)
Non accaduto (1969)
I giorni di Lun (1969)
Tre lettere a Raymond Roussel (1970)
Inventario di ottobre 1976 (1977)
A partire dal Dolce (1980)

Publications
Mi viene in mente (1967)
La quindicesima riga (1967)
Avventure nell'armadio di plexiglass (1968)
De consolatione picturae (1970)
Come ho dipinto certi miei quadri (1976)
Alphabet d'Éros (with Gilbert Lascault, 1976)
La Stazione del Conte Goluchowsky (1978)
L’altra casa (1979)
Agricola Cornelia S.p.A. 1973-81 (1981)
Monogrammes. Loin du doux (with Jean-François Lyotard, 1982)
La scomparsa di Amanda Silvers (1982)
How to imagine. A narrative on art and agriculture (with Henry Martin, 1983)
Why Duchamp ? An essay on aesthetic impact (with Henry Martin, 1985)
Bellissimo il giardino (1989)
Miss Omissis (1991)
Occhio di pietra (1995)
6 poèmes et 8 dessins (1995)
Quaranta evening in TV (1996)
Spettacolo di niente (2001)

References

1924 births
2023 deaths
20th-century Italian painters
21st-century Italian painters
20th-century Italian poets
21st-century Italian poets
People from Livorno
Italian contemporary artists